Galyasher is a rural locality (a village) in Kuprosskoye Rural Settlement, Yusvinsky District, Perm Krai, Russia. The population was 1 as of 2010. There are 2 streets.

Geography 
Galyasher is located 40 km east of Yusva (the district's administrative centre) by road. Malaya Mochga is the nearest rural locality.

References 

Rural localities in Yusvinsky District